Jacques Gabriel (1667–1742) was a French architect, the father of the famous Ange-Jacques Gabriel. Jacques Gabriel was a designer, painter and architect of the 17th and 18th centuries and one of the most prominent designers of the Versailles Palace in his lifetime. For his unique creativity and selflessness, he was always attended by Louis XIV and eventually became a trusted advisor to the monarch. He made important contributions to him during his years of service of which the construction of the Versailles palace was the most important.

He had a mission to build the Versailles Palace throughout his life and was also the first designer of the bridges in Paris. Gabriel's son (Ange Jacques Gabriel) continued his father's journey and in this regard, like his father, completed the Versailles palace at the time of Louis XIV. The Gabriel family is also home to the Cathedral of La Rochelle, the Royal Opera Royal Opera House and the Petit Trianon Palace, built on the palace of Versailles.

Biography
His mother was a cousin of Jules Hardouin-Mansart and his father, also named Jacques Gabriel, was a masonry contractor for the Bâtiments du Roi, the French royal works, and the designer of the Château de Choisy for the king's cousin, La Grande Mademoiselle.

Two years later he was sent to accompany Robert de Cotte on an eighteen-month sojourn in Italy, sharpening his eye, and on his return was made one of the Autres Architectes in the Bâtiments du Roi, where he proved an efficient administrator. He was made a member of the Académie at Mansart's reorganization of that body in 1699.

Pierre-Jean Mariette, who knew him well says that he was "expert in the conduct of building, but he could not have drawn the least jot of ornament".  For designers of ornament, Gabriel relied on Pierre Lepautre and after Lepautre's death, on Jean Aubert, another designer trained in the Bâtiments du Roi.

Gabriel succeeded Robert de Cotte as Premier Architecte du Roi of de Cotte's retirement in December 1734 and held the post until he was succeeded by his "vastly more gifted" son, Ange-Jacques Gabriel in 1742.

Gabriel's work in Paris has been much remodelled. Mariette's Architecture françoise offers plates illustrating several hôtels particuliers by Gabriel. He completed the Palais Bourbon (begun by Giardini, continued by Pierre Cailleteau Lassurance).  He completed the Hôtel de Lassay nearby. He was responsible for the Hôtel Peyrenc de Moras (de Biron), 1728–31.

Notes
 "Il étoit expert dans la conduite du bâtiment, mais il n'auroit pas pu dessiner le moindre bout d'ornement").

References

External links
Period Rooms in the Metropolitan Museum of Art , a fully digitized text from The Metropolitan Museum of Art Libraries (pp. 77–86). 

17th-century French architects
1667 births
1742 deaths
Architects from Paris
Architects of cathedrals
Members of the Académie royale d'architecture
Architects from Versailles